Scotts Valley is a small city in Santa Cruz County, California, United States, about  south of downtown San Jose and  north of the city of Santa Cruz, in the upland slope of the Santa Cruz Mountains. As of the 2020 census, the city population was 12,224. Principal access to the city is supplied by State Route 17 that connects San Jose and Santa Cruz. The city was incorporated in 1966.

History
Approximately ten thousand years ago there was a lake in the lowest elevation of Scotts Valley, and Paleo Indians lived near its shores. Archeological excavations of site CA-SCR-177 in 1983 and 1987 support dates for human settlement of this area as between 9,000 and 12,000 years before present (YBP). The lake later receded to form a peat bog. Later, around 2000 BC, Ohlone people occupied areas along the remaining creeks, spring and seep areas, along with permanent and seasonal drainages, and on flat ridges and terraces. Therefore, areas along watercourses are considered likely locations for prehistoric cultural resources. Several watercourses, including portions of Carbonera Creek, Bean Creek, and MacKenzie Creek, are within the city. Permanent villages were usually placed on elevations above seasonal flood levels. Surrounding areas were used for hunting and seed, acorn, and grass gathering.

Scotts Valley was named after Hiram Daniel Scott, who purchased Rancho San Agustin, including the valley, in 1850 from Joseph Ladd Majors.
Before Majors, the property was owned by José Bolcoff. Bolcoff was the original settler and first European to claim title and live in what was to be Scotts Valley. He was born Osip Volkov around 1794 in Petropavlovsk-Kamchatsky, Siberia. Working as a fur trader around 1815, Bolcoff jumped ship on the Monterey Bay shoreline, quickly assimilated into the Spanish culture, and was well received by the Spanish authorities. Volkov had his Russian Orthodox baptism validated in Mission Soledad in 1817, and was given the Spanish name José Antonio Bolcoff. Bolcoff lived with and traveled with Alta California's governor Pablo Vicente de Solá, acting as an interpreter.

Becoming a Mexican citizen in 1833, Bolcoff moved his family to his  land grant building, an adobe casa historians speculate was located near present-day Kings Village Shopping Center. Bolcoff relinquished his interest in the Rancho San Augustin, selling and accepting $400 from Joseph Ladd Majors, also known as Don Juan José Mechacas. July 7, 1846, marked the shift of power in the region from Mexico to the United States.

Hiram Scott built the Greek revival style Scott House in 1853. Situated behind City Hall, it is a Santa Cruz County Historical Trust Landmark and is on the National Register of Historic Places. The house originally stood on Scotts Valley Drive, near where a Bank of America branch is now located.

From the 1840s, money-making activity in Scotts Valley centered on several industries: lumber, grain, the milling of grain, and most importantly the tanning of hides and working of leather. Beginning in the 1930s, peat moss was removed from Scotts Valley and taken to San Francisco to supply soil for difficult indoor plants such as gardenias. When the peat ran out, sand and gravel were quarried and sold.

The area was the site of Santa's Village, a Christmas-themed amusement park which opened on May 30, 1957, on a  site which was formerly Lawridge Farm, part of the former Rancho San Augustin. "Residents" of the park included Santa, Mrs. Santa, and elves and gnomes who operated the rides and sold tickets. There was a petting zoo, a bobsled ride, a whirling Christmas tree ride, and a train ride, as well as a Fairy Tale Land. The park was sold in 1966 but continued to be operated under lease by the Santa's Village Corporation. When that corporation went bankrupt in 1977. the owner considered launching a Knott's Berry Farm type of complex but was denied a permit by the city of Scotts Valley, and the park closed for good in 1979.

Scotts Valley's most famous resident was film director Alfred Hitchcock, who lived in a mountaintop estate above the Vine Hill area from 1940 to 1972. Florence Owens Thompson, made famous by Dorothea Lange's Migrant Mother photograph, died in Scotts Valley in 1983.

Netflix was founded in Scotts Valley by Reed Hastings and Marc Randolph in 1997.

Economy

Tourism
From its early years as a stop on the stage route across the mountains, the Scotts Valley area has provided services to travelers. With the growing popularity of the automobile in the early 20th century, the area became commercialized and tourism developed as a local industry.

In the early 1920s, Edward Evers established Camp Evers at the junction of the State Highway and Mt. Hermon Road. Camp Evers consisted of a small store, gas pumps, dance hall and tents, becoming a resort and rest stop for travelers.

The Beverly Gardens were established in the 1930s and featured a collection of exotic birds and animals, a restaurant, and cabins.

Axel Erlandson opened The Tree Circus in 1947, featuring trees grafted and trained in strange and unusual shapes. Bright "life size" painted dinosaurs overlooking Highway 17 were added to the Tree Circus in 1964 when it changed its name to The Lost World. Surviving trees have since been moved to Gilroy Gardens.

Santa's Village, one of three locations in America's first theme park chain, was established in 1956. It was the most popular of the many attractions, attracting millions of visitors to Scotts Valley for over twenty years, and it was the last of Scotts Valley's theme parks to close its doors, in 1979. H. Glenn Holland, who had already developed a Santa's Village elsewhere the previous year, leased  at the former Lawridge Farm, which was a portion of the former Rancho San Augustin for the Scotts Valley location of Santa's Village. The park maintained a historically correct team of Mexican burros that lived on the back  field. Four reindeer from Unalakleet, Alaska, pulled Santa's sleigh. All the buildings were designed to look like log chalet-type structures, replete with snowy roofs and gingerbread trim. One chalet housed a legendary fresh gingerbread bakery. Theme-appropriate music flowed from speakers hidden in towering redwood trees. In 1977 the Santa's Village Corporation had filed for bankruptcy, and in 1979 the park's gates were finally closed. The site is currently a playing field at the former headquarters of Borland.

Scotts Valley is also near Big Basin Redwoods State Park, Henry Cowell Redwoods State Park, and Roaring Camp Railroads. The town is surrounded by coast redwood forests. The city of Santa Cruz lies to the south. A relatively large municipal skateboard park, where pro skateboarder Eric Costello died in October 2005 due to improper helmet use, is near Skypark, the site of a former airport, in central Scotts Valley.

Three hotels operate in Scotts Valley: a Best Western hotel located near the Granite Creek entrance to Highway 17, a Four Points by Sheraton located on Scotts Valley Drive, and a Hilton hotel located near the Mount Hermon junction with Highway 17.

Redevelopment and high technology
Evidence regarding blighted conditions in the Redevelopment Area of Santa's Village and the Skypark Airport was established in the year 1990.

E-mu Systems, Seagate Technology, Sessions, and Borland Software Corporation were all formerly headquartered in Scotts Valley.

Zero Motorcycles manufactures all-electric motorcycles in Scotts Valley.

Netflix's first headquarters were established in Scotts Valley by Reed Hastings, a Stanford graduate, in 1997. The headquarters were later moved to nearby Los Gatos, California.

In May 2016, the University of California, Santa Cruz signed a 20-year lease to occupy the former Borland headquarters establishing its Scotts Valley Center. The center serves as the professional offices for three of its divisions — Information Technology services, Business and Administrative services, and University Relations.

Top employers
According to Scotts Valley's 2021 Comprehensive Annual Financial Report, the top employers in the city are:

Demographics

2010
The 2010 United States Census reported that Scotts Valley had a population of 11,580. The racial makeup of Scotts Valley was 9,958 (86.0%) White, 101 (0.9%) African American, 57 (0.5%) Native American, 590 (5.1%) Asian, 18 (0.2%) Pacific Islander, 292 (2.5%) from other races, and 564 (4.9%) from two or more races. Hispanic or Latino of any race were 1,158 persons (10.0%).

The Census reported that 11,308 people (97.7% of the population) lived in households, 264 (2.3%) lived in non-institutionalized group quarters, and 8 (0.1%) were institutionalized.

There were 4,426 households, out of which 1,588 (35.9%) had children under the age of 18 living in them, 2,423 (54.7%) were opposite-sex married couples living together, 474 (10.7%) had a female householder with no husband present, 189 (4.3%) had a male householder with no wife present. There were 206 (4.7%) unmarried opposite-sex partnerships, and 43 (1.0%) same-sex married couples or partnerships. 1,054 households (23.8%) were made up of individuals, and 516 (11.7%) had someone living alone who was 65 years of age or older. The average household size was 2.55. There were 3,086 families (69.7% of all households); the average family size was 3.03.

The population was spread out, with 2,863 people (24.7%) under the age of 18, 969 people (8.4%) aged 18 to 24, 2,513 people (21.7%) aged 25 to 44, 3,660 people (31.6%) aged 45 to 64, and 1,575 people (13.6%) who were 65 years of age or older. The median age was 41.7 years. For every 100 females, there were 95.1 males. For every 100 females age 18 and over, there were 91.0 males.

The homeowner vacancy rate was 1.4%; the rental vacancy rate was 3.2%. 8,558 people (73.9% of the population) lived in owner-occupied housing units and 2,750 people (23.7%) lived in rental housing units.

2000
As of the census of 2000, there were 11,385 people, 4,273 households, and 2,969 families residing in the city. The racial makeup of the city was 88.63% White, 0.48% African American, 0.40% Native American, 4.62% Asian, 0.18% Pacific Islander, 2.15% from other races, and 3.53% from two or more races. Hispanic or Latino of any race were 6.40% of the population.

There were 4,273 households, out of which 36.4% had children under the age of 18 living with them, 58.3% were married couples living together, 7.9% had a female householder with no husband present, and 30.5% were non-families. 23.4% of all households were made up of individuals, and 11.6% had someone living alone who was 65 years of age or older. The average household size was 2.56 and the average family size was 3.05.

In the city, the population was spread out, with 25.8% under the age of 18, 7.0% from 18 to 24, 30.2% from 25 to 44, 23.2% from 45 to 64, and 13.8% who were 65 years of age or older. The median age was 38 years. For every 100 females, there were 94.9 males. For every 100 females age 18 and over, there were 90.6 males.

The median income for a household in the city was $72,449, and the median income for a family was $88,573. Males had a median income of $74,183 versus $40,492 for females. The per capita income for the city was $35,684. About 0.9% of families and 2.5% of the population were below the poverty line, including 1.2% of those under age 18 and 4.0% of those age 65 or over.

Government
In the state legislature, Scotts Valley is in the 17th Senate District, represented by Democrat John Laird, and in the 28th Assembly District, represented by Democrat Gail Pellerin.

Education
From 1950 to 2011, Scotts Valley was home to Bethany University, a four-year private Christian university. The campus was leased to Olivet University for the 2011–2012 school year, but Olivet was unable to complete a purchase and moved back to San Francisco in May 2012. The parent Assemblies of God denomination is seeking another buyer for the campus.

The Scotts Valley Unified School District operates four public schools: Scotts Valley High School (grades 9 to 12), Scotts Valley Middle School (grades 6 to 8), and two elementary schools: Vine Hill School (grades Kindergarten to 5) and Brook Knoll School. They also operate an Independent Study/Home School program. Together these schools serve more than 2,600 students each year.

Baymonte Christian School serves students from pre-Kindergarten through eighth grades. Baymonte is a non-denominational Protestant Bible school that was founded in 1968. In 2003, it earned the distinction of being a Blue Ribbon School, a distinction awarded to one school in 25 across the nation.

Monterey Coast Preparatory School, a private school offering a college preparatory curriculum for middle and high schoolers with learning differences, moved from its original location in Santa Cruz to Scotts Valley in 2014.

Former venues

The Barn
In the fall of 1965, Eric Nord, proprietor of coffee houses including the Hungry I in San Francisco, and the Sticky Wicket in Aptos, also opened The Barn (1965—1968), an art gallery and coffee house, with a large area for concerts, on the site of the Frapwell Dairy Barn (1914—1948), in Scotts Valley. Janis Joplin and the Grateful Dead performed at The Barn. Tom Wolfe describes the Merry Pranksters and Ken Kesey, from La Honda, at The Barn, in the last chapter of The Electric Kool-Aid Acid Test. At Scott's Valley Drive, just off Highway 17, The Barn as a nightclub closed by 1968, with the Baymonte Christian School taking control of the property. The Barn resurrected as a dinner theater in an RV park in the 70s, and eventually a warehouse for Seagate Technologies. The Barn was torn down in 1991.

Santa's Village
Unrelated to the prior Santa's Village (Jefferson, New Hampshire) (1953—), Santa's Village (Scotts Valley) (1957—1979) was an amusement park, built after Santa's Village (Lake Arrowhead) (1955—1998, 2016–present), San Bernardino County, and built before Santa's Village AZoosment Park (1959—2006, 2011–present), East Dundee, Illinois, located near highway 17, Borland would later built its campus on the site.

Geography and environment
Scotts Valley is in the west hills of the Santa Cruz Mountains. State Route 17 connects Scotts Valley to Santa Cruz to the south and to Los Gatos, San Jose, and the South Bay area to the north.

Scotts Valley is located at the southern end of the WWF-designated Northern California coastal forests ecoregion.

It is in central Santa Cruz County, in the northern portion of the North Central Coast Air Basin.

Climate
Air in Scotts Valley is typically maritime in origin, as it moves over the land from the Pacific Ocean. Summers are warm and dry, while winters are mild and generally rainy. Most rain falls as a result of winter Pacific storms between the months of November and April. Sound levels in Scotts Valley are typically in the range of 57 to 65 dBA, except for somewhat higher levels within  from Highway 17.

Scotts Valley has mild weather throughout the year, enjoying a Mediterranean climate (Köppen Csb) characterized by cool, wet winters and warm, mostly dry summers. Due to its proximity to Monterey Bay, fog and low overcast are common during the night and morning hours, especially in the summer.

Infrastructure
Drinking water is supplied to the City of Scotts Valley by the Scotts Valley Water District and the San Lorenzo Valley Water District. Domestic water supplies are obtained solely from groundwater sources extracted by wells. Wastewater in Scotts Valley is treated at the Scotts Valley Wastewater Treatment Plant at Scotts Valley and Mount Hermon Roads. Treated wastewater effluent is pumped via the city of Santa Cruz into the Pacific Ocean.

Bus service from Scotts Valley to Santa Cruz, California; the San Lorenzo Valley; and San Jose, California; is provided by the Santa Cruz Metropolitan Transit District.

The Santa Cruz Sky Park, a small recreational airport, closed in 1983.

Sister cities
 Nichinan, Japan

References

External links

 City of Scotts Valley official site
 Information for Scotts Valley visitors from the Santa Cruz County Conference & Visitors Council

Cities in Santa Cruz County, California
Incorporated cities and towns in California
1966 establishments in California